Hospital Road is a street in Sai Ying Pun, Hong Kong.

Features

 King George V Memorial Park
 Prince Philip Dental Hospital
 Tsan Yuk Hospital

Intersections
 Bonham Road
 Pound Lane
 Second Street
 Eastern Street

See also
 List of streets and roads in Hong Kong

External links
 

Odonyms referring to a building
Sai Ying Pun
Roads on Hong Kong Island